Rrröööaaarrr is the second studio album by Canadian heavy metal band Voivod. It was released in 1986 on Noise Records. Estimated sales are more than 40,000 copies, worldwide. In a 2012 interview with Michael Dodd of Get Your Rock Out, vocalist Denis Bélanger stated that, while a thrash record, the album represents a progression from thrash sound of War and Pain to the more progressive metal elements that would feature on Killing Technology.

Track listing
All lyrics by Snake, and all music by Piggy, Blacky & Away.

Personnel
Voivod
Snake (Denis Bélanger) - vocals
Piggy (Denis D'Amour) - guitar, assistant engineer
Blacky (Jean-Yves Thériault) - bass guitar, assistant engineer
Away (Michel Langevin) - drums, artwork

Production
Mike Amstadt - producer, engineer
Maurice "Rocker" Richard - executive producer

References

1986 albums
Voivod (band) albums
Noise Records albums
Combat Records albums